Balibo is a 2009 Australian war film that follows the story of the Balibo Five, a group of journalists who were captured and killed while reporting on activities just prior to the Indonesian invasion of East Timor of 1975. The film is loosely based on the 2001 book Cover-Up by Jill Jolliffe, an Australian journalist who met the men before they were killed.

The film follows dishevelled journalist Roger East, played by Anthony LaPaglia, who travels to East Timor in 1975 to investigate the deaths of the Balibo Five during the buildup to the Indonesian invasion of East Timor. Oscar Isaac plays the young José Ramos-Horta, who would later receive the Nobel Peace Prize and become the second President of East Timor, who joins East in the movie.

Filming began on 30 June 2008, in Dili, East Timor, and the film was released the following year. It was produced by Arenafilm in Australia with Robert Connolly as director, David Williamson as screenwriter, and Professor Clinton Fernandes as historical consultant.
LaPaglia, also an Executive Producer, named East as "probably the best role I've ever had".

Plot
The film starts when an Australian journalist interviewed a woman named Juliana, who as a young girl witnessed Roger East's capture and execution by the Indonesian invasion force.

The point of view goes first on Roger East's investigation upon the imminent Indonesian invasion of East Timor. Also, he investigates the fate of the Balibo Five, who was in Balibo covering the events in the area.

Then the point of view changes to the Balibo Five's actions in the town, from their departure in Australia, to their arrival in East Timor and was inserted in a Revolutionary Front for an Independent East Timor (abbreviated as FRETILIN from the Portuguese name) unit near the border.

Then the story interchanges between Roger East's attempted investigation upon the fate of the Five, and the Five's events in the area, and some of Juliana's story on the journo. Roger was with Jose Ramos-Horta as his bodyguard along the way, evading Indonesian patrols and seeing villages with massacred inhabitants, and also settled their arguments between Roger's insistence of knowing the truth and Jose's hesitance to assist such a risky move. While the Five were with a FRETILIN unit, up to the point of the Indonesian attack on their position.

They painted Australia upon the building to ensure their safety, but it was nothing to Indonesian invaders. The Five declined requests of their FRETILIN bodyguards to join them into the retreat from the area. The Five is then covering the invasion, when the Indonesian soldiers chased and cornered them. One of the cameramen tried to tell the soldiers to spare them, but was shot by the officer Yunus Yosfiah. Then, the soldiers breached the building, killing the 3 and the surviving journo was captured and repeatedly stabbed to death by a bayonet.

Then Roger's point of view ended when the Indonesians invade Dili with paratroopers and ground troops. He was captured with East Timorese men and Juliana watches as the men were executed by the Indonesians, women were segregated and raped, and Roger was executed by the Indonesian soldiers. The interviewer ended Juliana's interview and she leaves while hugging a child.

The film ends with the inscription that the murderers of the Balibo Five and Roger East were not put to justice and pictures from the groups, and scenes from Horta's rallies and later on, East Timorese enjoying the beach.

Cast
Anthony LaPaglia as Roger East
Oscar Isaac as José Ramos-Horta
Damon Gameau as Greg Shackleton
Gyton Grantley as Gary Cunningham
Nathan Phillips as Malcolm Rennie
Mark Winter as Tony Stewart
Thomas Wright as Brian Peters
Michael Stone as Interviewer
Bea Viegas as Juliana
Anamaria Barreto as Younger Juliana

Production

Balibo was the first feature film to be made in East Timor. Shooting in Dili began on 31 July 2008, with United Nations police closing off roads, to allow the scenes to be filmed. Gritty 16mm-to-35mm visuals shot at the actual locations where the events took place give a documentary-style texture.

The film's version of events was validated by an Australian coroner in 2007. After a fresh review of the evidence, the coroner ruled that the journalists were executed as they tried to surrender to Indonesian forces.
The filmmakers hope that Balibo will spur the Australian government into action. Almost 18 months on, it has not responded to the coroner's findings – a reticence which may stem from its fear of upsetting diplomatic relations with Jakarta. Robert Connolly said that he did not set out to provoke Jakarta but wanted to examine a seminal moment in Indonesia's 24-year occupation of East Timor, when an estimated 183,000 people died: "I think it had to be graphic because otherwise you dangerously dilute what happened."

Release

Balibo received its world premiere at the Melbourne International Film Festival on 24 July 2009 at Melbourne's Hamer Hall.

It screened at the Antipodean Film Festival in Saint Tropez, France, in October 2010.

Reception

The then President of East Timor, José Ramos-Horta, was in attendance at the world premiere, where there was an address alleging that the Balibo Five were tortured and killed by Indonesian forces. On changes over recent years in Indonesia Ramos-Horta said "It is better. Indonesian democracy today is one of the most inspiring in the south-east Asia region". Also in attendance were the families of the Balibo Five. Relatives of Tony Stewart held aloft a banner bearing his name which had been embroidered by East Timorese women. Maureen Tolfree, sister of Brian Peters, said she hoped many Australians would see the film and that she thought "...it will bring to the Australian public what's gone on," she said.
Rotten Tomatoes gives a score of 100% based on 12 reviews, 80% of audiences like the film.

Varietys Richard Kuipers dubbed the film "a tense, character-driven thriller with political comment on the side, allowing viewers with little or no prior knowledge of the subject matter to engage instinctively with the Balibo Five," filmed where it happened and "packing a huge emotional punch". Kuipers continues: "LaPaglia is particularly good as the weary scribe who slowly rediscovers his old fire, and Isaac sparks off him impressively as the younger man whose ability to read people is as sharp as his political acumen."

Screen Internationals Frank Hatherley opined: "Shot on location with loving attention to period detail, the film's take on these long-buried events is convincing. Connolly's three strands are expertly woven together, coming to twin climaxes where terror and cruelty overwhelm everyone. These 'killing field' scenes are not for the squeamish."

The Monthlys Luke Davies wrote: "Jill Jollife's book ... argues that the Australian government has always known the exact circumstances of the newsmen's deaths. Connolly doesn't try to answer such questions, but rather lets them echo in the film."  Davies commended Connolly and co-screenwriter David Williamson for having "crafted an engaging film in which we come to care about the destiny of an entire people as well as for individual characters", and that "the film's denouement is terrifying", making it a realistic and confronting experience.

Box office
Balibo grossed $1,330,863 at the box office in Australia.

Accolades

Indonesian ban
The film was to have premiered in Indonesia at the 2009 Jakarta International Film Festival. However, in advance of a private screening, the film was banned by the Indonesian Film Censorship Agency. Indonesian Foreign Minister Marty Natalegawa said the ban was to avoid a negative "global perception of Indonesia". The Indonesian military supported the ban, with a spokesman saying the film could harm Indonesia's relations with Timor Leste and Australia. He also repeated the official version of events, namely that the journalists were killed in a crossfire, and not by Indonesian troops.

See also
 Cinema of Australia

References

Further reading
 Jill Jolliffe. Balibo (revised and updated). Melbourne, Scribe. 2009. .

External links
 
 
 
Balibo at Oz Movies
 Hindsight Has Not Cleared the Vision of an Atrocity, Gerard Henderson, Sydney Morning Herald, 17 August 2009.
 Balibo's Grisly Truth, Caroline Overington, The Australian, 4 August 2009.
 John Pilger "A travesty of omissions", New Statesman, 20 August 2009

2009 films
2009 drama films
2000s biographical films
2000s English-language films
Australian drama films
Australian biographical films
Biographical films about war correspondents
Australian films based on actual events
APRA Award winners
Films set in 1975
Films set in East Timor
Films set in the Northern Territory
Film controversies in Indonesia
Films directed by Robert Connolly